is a former Japanese football player.

Club statistics
Updated to 23 February 2017.

References

External links

1988 births
Living people
Nihon University alumni
Association football people from Ibaraki Prefecture
Japanese footballers
J2 League players
J3 League players
Japan Football League players
Thespakusatsu Gunma players
Kagoshima United FC players
Association football midfielders